Chobanlu is an abandoned village in the Syunik Province of Armenia.

References

External links 

Geography of Syunik Province
Former populated places in Syunik Province